Mae Sam Laep is a village and tambon (sub-district) of Sop Moei District, in Mae Hong Son Province, Thailand. In 2005 it had a population of 9,802. The tambon contains  10 villages. Mae Sam Laep lies on the on the Salween River which marks the border with Myanmar.

References

Tambon of Mae Hong Son province
Populated places in Mae Hong Son province